The Embassy of the United Kingdom in Stockholm is the chief diplomatic mission of the United Kingdom in Sweden. The Embassy also represents the British Overseas Territories in Sweden. It is located on Skarpögatan in the Diplomatstaden neighbourhood. The current British Ambassador to Sweden is Judith Gough.

History
Great Britain established a diplomatic mission in Stockholm in 1720. The current embassy building located at Skarpögatan 6-8, was opened in 1967 and was designed by the architect William S. Bryant. Since 2018, the building has also housed the New Zealand Embassy to Sweden. 

The British Ambassador's residence, which was built between 1914 and 1915 and was designed by Richard Allison, is located in the same area as the embassy, at Laboratoriegatan 8. Until 1939 it also served as the British Embassy.

Gallery

See also
List of diplomatic missions in Sweden
List of ambassadors of the United Kingdom to Sweden

References

Stockholm
United Kingdom
Buildings and structures in Stockholm
Sweden–United Kingdom relations